Timothy "Tim" Rupert Thorogood (born 15 May 1962) is an English administrator who served as Chief Executive of the Falkland Islands from 2008 until 2012.

Thorogood was born in Barbados and spent time as a child in the Falklands, where his father worked for Cable & Wireless. In 1983, he received an MA in history from the University of Cambridge before going on to get an MA in education, an MBA and PhD in Management from the Open University.

After University, Thorogood worked at a school in Gosport, Hampshire, becoming the head of the school's history department. He then moved into local government working in Hertfordshire's LEA and the London Borough of Hillingdon, before becoming Director of Strategic Services in Three Rivers District Council and later Director of Support Services in Haringey Council. In March 2003 he was appointed Chief Executive of the City and County of Swansea Council. Following his resignation from Swansea Council, Thorogood became the head of the Local Government Information Unit.,.

In August 2007, the Legislative Assembly of the Falkland Islands selected Thorogood to be the British Overseas Territory's new Chief Executive. He took up the position on 3 January 2008. During his time as Chief Executive, the Falkland Islands Government increased investment in the search for hydrocarbons in the waters surrounding the islands. In 2011, Thorogood announced that he would be leaving the Falklands for family reasons. He left office in 2012 and was replaced by the Director of Finance, Keith Padgett.

References

1962 births
Alumni of the Open University
Alumni of the University of Cambridge
British diplomats
Schoolteachers from Hampshire
Chief Executives of the Falkland Islands
Living people